Mansour Al-Soraihi (born June 15, 1971) is a Yemeni judoka who competed for Yemen at the 1992 Summer Olympics.

Career
Al-Soraihi competed in the half-lightweight class at the 1992 Summer Olympics, he was drawn against Sandeep Byala from India in the second round after receiving a bye in the first round, but he lost so didn't advance any further.

References

External links
 

1971 births
Living people
Yemeni male judoka
Olympic judoka of Yemen
Judoka at the 1992 Summer Olympics